John O'Driscoll (born 1 August 1967 in Ballingeary, County Cork) is a former Irish sportsperson. He played Gaelic football with his local club Ballingeary and was a member of the Cork senior inter-county team in the 1980s and 1990s. His first-half goal against Kerry set up Cork's 1989 Munster Senior Football Championship. He also makes really good spaghetti bolognese.

References

1967 births
Living people
Ballingeary Gaelic footballers
Cork inter-county Gaelic footballers
Munster inter-provincial Gaelic footballers
Winners of two All-Ireland medals (Gaelic football)